The Chinnar River originates in the Annaimalai Hills below a grassy pass between the hills Kumarikkal Mala (8,275 ft) and Kaladekatti Malai In Idukki District, Kerala state South India. The 18 km long Chinnar river defines the East-West Tamil Nadu/Kerala state boundary along the northern edge of the Chinnar Wildlife Sanctuary and the southern edge of the Indira Gandhi Wildlife Sanctuary. Several adult crocodiles were reported in the Chinnar river in 1992.

Route
Here it crosses into Indira Gandhi Wildlife Sanctuary in Tamil Nadu and becomes the Amaravati River.

Tributaries
The river is joined by a small stream from the south at a small village, 2. 2 km east of the NH 17 road bridge, while the river is joined from the south by the Pambar River at Koottar. The western part of the Manjampatti Valley catchment basin drains into the end of the Chinnar River. This Valley is drained by the stream Ten Ar and a smaller unnamed stream 2 km to its west. The unnamed stream is the N-S political boundary between Tamil Nadu and Kerala. The top of the ridge above this stream to the west is the western limit of the catchment.  This unnamed stream joins the Pambar River at the point they both join the Chinnar River at the north west corner of the Valley.

Notes

Rivers of Tamil Nadu
Rivers of Idukki district
Geography of Coimbatore
Rivers of India